Peter Williams (28 September 1957 – 26 May 2014) was a South African cricketer. He played first-class cricket for Eastern Province and Natal between 1978 and 1989.

References

External links
 

1957 births
2014 deaths
South African cricketers
Eastern Province cricketers
KwaZulu-Natal cricketers
Cricketers from Pietermaritzburg